Ricard Pérez Casado (Valencia, 27 October 1945) is a Spanish politician and former mayor of Valencia who belongs to the Spanish Socialist Workers' Party (PSOE).

Married with one son, Pérez studied Economic Science at University of Barcelona and graduated in Political and Social Science at Complutense University of Madrid before gaining a PhD in history from University of Valencia. During the Franco era he became involved in the Valencian Socialist Party (PSV) which later became linked to the PSOE. In 1979 he became mayor of Valencia, replacing Ferran Martínez Castellano who was expelled from the party after a dispute over abandoning the party's residual Marxism. Pérez was re-elected in 1983 and 1987, however he resigned in 1988 after disagreements with the local branch of the party.

In 1996 he served as European Union administrator for the Bosnian city of Mostar. He entered national politics in 2000 when he was elected to the national parliament as a deputy for Valencia but not stand in 2004. He has also served as vice-president of the Council of European Municipalities and Regions and currently serves on the Federal Committee of the PSOE.

External links
 Biography at Spanish Congress website

References

1945 births
Living people
Members of the 7th Congress of Deputies (Spain)
Spanish Socialist Workers' Party politicians
University of Barcelona alumni
Mayors of Valencia